Pudhiya Mannargal is a 1994 Indian Tamil-language film directed by Vikraman with music by A. R. Rahman. The film stars Vikram and Mohini. The movie's score and soundtrack are composed by A. R. Rahman. The film did not perform well commercially.

Plot

Cast 

Vikram as Satyamoorthy
Mohini as Vidhya
Babu Ganesh as Pandian
Nalinikanth as Chitti Babu
Vivek as Araitchi Ariandndham
Prithiveeraj
Sriman
Dhamu
Soundarya Kumar
Udhayan (Sakthi Kumar)
Mahesh
S. S. Chandran as S. S.
Vinu Chakravarthy as Tamilmagan
Delhi Ganesh as Vidhya's Father
Y. Vijaya as House owner
Kamala Kamesh
P. R. Varalakshmi
Neelu
Sampath Kumar
Pasi Narayanan
Karuppu Subbiah
Typist Gopu
LIC Narasimhan
Manager Cheena
Perumal
Tirupur Ramasamy
Singamuthu as S.S's P.A
Peter Hein as Henchman (uncredited)

Production
During the making of Pudhiya Mannargal, Vikram was approached by Mani Ratnam to star in Bombay (1995). However, Vikram had grown his hair long and had a beard for the film, and could not change his appearance to accept Ratnam's offer.

Soundtrack 
All songs were composed by A. R. Rahman and lyrics were by Palani Bharathi and Kalidasan. The song "Nee Kattum Selai" attained popularity.

Reception 
New Straits Times wrote "Nothing much in this movie but a controversial idea". The film did not perform well commercially, with Sudhish Kamath noting, "The problem with it: the same old cliches of commercial cinema — the film was ridden with stereotypes, predictable incidents triggered by unidimensional screen villains".

References

External links 
 

1990s political thriller films
1990s Tamil-language films
1994 action thriller films
1994 films
Films directed by Vikraman
Films scored by A. R. Rahman
Films set in universities and colleges
Indian action thriller films
Indian political thriller films